Kevin Bivona (born November 8, 1986) is an American multi-instrumentalist and audio engineer best known for his work with Tim Armstrong's various musical projects, particularly the Transplants and Rancid. He is currently the guitarist for the ska punk band the Interrupters.

Early career 
In 2005, Bivona became the touring keyboard player for The Transplants on the Vans Warped Tour.  Following the Warped Tour, he began to work around Los Angeles as a recording engineer. This led to continued involvement with Transplants, as well as Paul Wall, Travis Barker, Dirt Nasty, The Cool Kids, and Psycho White.

Personal life 
Bivona is married to fellow Interrupters band member Aimee Allen. The other two members of the Interrupters are his twin brothers.

With The Transplants and studio work 
On March 2, 2011, Bivona appeared on The Tonight Show with Jay Leno with Travis Barker and Cypress Hill, performing "The Beat Goes On" off Barker's debut solo album.
On March 7, 2011, he appeared on Conan with the Transplants performing "Saturday Night" off Travis' solo record.

In 2011, he engineered and mixed the Jimmy Cliff record Rebirth produced by Tim Armstrong.  Both Armstrong and Bivona were awarded the Grammy Award for "Best Reggae Album."

In 2012, Bivona and Aimee Allen co-founded the Los Angeles-based ska-punk band The Interrupters along with his brothers, twins Jesse and Justin. Their debut record was released August 5, 2014, on Hellcat Records.

"Tim Timebomb" project 
From October 2012 to October 2013, Bivona was heavily involved in the Tim Timebomb project, in which Rancid frontman Tim Armstrong released a song a day for a year via his website.

During the summer of 2013, the Transplants toured the US and Canada, opening for Rancid. The Rancid headlining tour was split into three legs, with the Transplants on the first two legs of the tour. For the third and final leg of the Rancid tour, the Tim Timebomb project took the Transplants' direct support spot. While Bivona played bass in Transplants, and organ, piano and guitar in Tim Timebomb, he also played organ/piano for a few Rancid songs for the extent of the tour. His band The Interrupters were opening support for the second and third legs of the tour.

Selected discography

References

External links 
 AllMusic album credits

1986 births
Living people
American audio engineers
American male musicians
American rock musicians
American multi-instrumentalists
Transplants (band) members